Streptomyces violaceusniger is a bacterium species from the genus of Streptomyces. Streptomyces violaceusniger has antifungal activity. Streptomyces violaceusniger produces isoafricanol and spirofungin.

Further reading

See also 
 List of Streptomyces species

References

External links
Type strain of Streptomyces violaceusniger at BacDive -  the Bacterial Diversity Metadatabase	

violaceusniger
Bacteria described in 1958